Jude is a 1996 British period drama film directed by Michael Winterbottom, and written by Hossein Amini, based on Thomas Hardy's 1895 novel Jude the Obscure. The original music score was composed by Adrian Johnston.

The film was shot in late 1995 in Edinburgh and locations in County Durham including Durham Cathedral, Durham City, Ushaw College, Blanchland village and Beamish museum.

In a 2011 interview for theartsdesk, lead actor Christopher Eccleston commented on the film: "Of all the films I've done, Jude is the one that I'd stand by, the one I'd like people to come back to. The rest is much of a muchness."

Plot
In the Victorian period, Jude Fawley is a bright young lower-class man who dreams of a university education. Circumstances conspire against him, and he is forced into a job as a stonemason and an unhappy marriage to a country girl, Arabella. He remains true to his dream and, months later, after his wife's sudden departure, he heads for the city. He thinks education is available for any man who is willing to work hard. However, he is rejected by the university based primarily on his lower-class status. During this period, he encounters his cousin, Sue Bridehead, who is beautiful and intelligent, and shares his disdain for convention. Whilst Jude is enraptured by Sue, and vice versa, she marries Jude's former school teacher, Phillotson, after Jude tells her he is married to Arabella.

The marriage of Sue and Phillotson is not a success, as she refuses to give herself sexually or romantically to her husband. She leaves Phillotson to join Jude in what turns out to be a rough life, moving from place to place as Jude picks up occasional work as a stonemason. Jude learns that Arabella bore a son, whom she named Jude ("Juey") soon after she left Jude. The boy comes to live with his father Jude, and Sue. Sue gives birth to two children. Agnostic and independent, she refuses to legalise their arrangement by marriage.

Sue and Jude are forbidden a permanent rental lodging because their living arrangement without marriage is considered scandalous. Sue tells Juey that the family cannot stay long at their present lodging because there are too many of them. The next day Sue and Jude return to their lodging to find that Juey has killed his half-siblings and committed suicide, hanging himself. His suicide note says the reason: "Becos we were to menny."

Each of the couple falls into a deep depression after the deaths of their children. Turning to the religion she previously rejected, Sue comes to believe that God has judged and punished the couple for not having married. She decides to return to Phillotson, although she finds him sexually repugnant, as he is her true husband in the eyes of God.

A year after the death of their children, Jude and Sue happen to meet when separately visiting the tombstones of their children. They both look worse for wear. Jude demands that Sue tell him whether she still loves him, to which she replies, "You've always known". After a passionate kiss, she walks away from Jude to return to Phillotson.

As Sue walks away, Jude shouts to her, "We are man and wife, if ever two people were on this earth!"

Cast

Filming locations
The production filmed in a variety of countries including France, New Zealand and the UK. The Kent and East Sussex Railway  was used as a film location for the scenes where Jude (Christopher Eccleston) and Sue (Kate Winslet) are on a train which was intercut with scenery from the North of England.

Reception
It holds an 81% rating on Rotten Tomatoes, based on 42 reviews, with an average rating of 7.3/10. The consenus summarizes: "Superb acting from a beautifully matched Christopher Eccleston and Kate Winslet make Jude well worth watching even as it struggles with its source material." On Metacritic, the film has a score of 68 out of 100 based on 18 critics, indicating "generally favorable reviews".

References

External links

 
 
 

1996 films
1996 romantic drama films
BBC Film films
British romantic drama films
British independent films
1990s English-language films
Films based on British novels
Films based on romance novels
Films based on works by Thomas Hardy
Films directed by Michael Winterbottom
Films set in Berkshire
Films set in the Victorian era
Films shot in Edinburgh
PolyGram Filmed Entertainment films
Films with screenplays by Hossein Amini
1996 independent films
1990s British films